The Benjamin Franklin silver dollar is a commemorative coin issued by the United States Mint in 2006.

The reverse contains a central depiction of the 1776 Continental Currency dollar coin, which was designed by Franklin.

See also

 List of United States commemorative coins and medals (2000s)
 United States commemorative coins

References

2006 establishments in the United States
Benjamin Franklin
Modern United States commemorative coins
Sun on coins